Orient Express is a 2004 Romanian film directed by Sergiu Nicolaescu. It was Romania's submission to the 77th Academy Awards for the Academy Award for Best Foreign Language Film, but was not accepted as a nominee.

Cast
 Sergiu Nicolaescu — Prince Andrei Morudzi
 Maia Morgenstern — Baroness Amalia Frunzetti
  — Ana Criveanu
 Dan Bittman — young Andrei Morudzi
 Gheorghe Dinică — Costache
 Valentin Teodosiu — Vasile Gărdescu
 Ioana Moldovan — Isabelle Beny
  — Bob
 Dan Puric — Count Orkovski
  — Elena Criveanu
 Florin Zamfirescu — Take Criveanu
 Daniela Nane — Carmen Ionescu
  — Adrienne de Raval
  — Priest Anton

See also

 List of submissions to the 77th Academy Awards for Best Foreign Language Film

References

External links

2004 films
2000s Romanian-language films
2004 romantic drama films
Romanian romantic drama films